Bayburt Özel İdarespor is a Turkish professional football club based in Bayburt. The team currently competes in the TFF Second League after being promoted following the 2018–19 season. The club was promoted to the TFF Third League after 2013–14 season.

League participations
TFF Third League: 2014–present
Turkish Regional Amateur League: 2012–2014

Stadium
Currently the team plays at the 5,000-person capacity Genç Osman Stadium.

Current squad

Other players under contract

References

External links 
Official Facebook
Bayburtspor on TFF.org

TFF Third League clubs
Football clubs in Turkey
Association football clubs established in 1989
1989 establishments in Turkey